Vazhappully Shree Rajarajeshwari temple is a Hindu temple located at Kazhimbram near Valapad in Thrissur District. This is one of the few family temples in Kerala worshipping Gandharva.

References

Shakti temples
Devi temples in Kerala
Hindu temples in Thrissur district